The 1995 Wisconsin Badgers football team represented the University of Wisconsin during the 1995 NCAA Division I-A football season. They were led by sixth year head coach Barry Alvarez and participated as members of the Big Ten Conference. The Badgers played their home games at Camp Randall Stadium in Madison, Wisconsin.  Wisconsin did not make a postseason bowl game for the first time since the 1992 season.

As a result of college football's adoption of an overtime beginning with the 1995 bowl season and the 1996 regular season, Wisconsin's 3–3 tie against Illinois is the last tied game in NCAA Division I-A history.

Schedule

Roster

Game summaries

Colorado

Stanford

SMU

Penn State

Ohio State

Northwestern

Michigan State

Purdue

Minnesota

Iowa

Illinois

Team players selected in the 1996 NFL Draft

References

Wisconsin
Wisconsin Badgers football seasons
Wisconsin Badgers football